The Debutante Stakes is the name of a Thoroughbred horse race  in various countries:

 Debutante Stakes (Ireland)
 Churchill Downs Debutante Stakes
 Del Mar Debutante Stakes